The Sri Lanka women's national 3x3 team is a national basketball team of Sri Lanka, administered by the Sri Lanka Basketball Federation.

It represents the country in international 3x3 (3 against 3) women's basketball competitions.

Until 2021, the team has mainly been competitive in junior tournaments and the Asia Cup.

See also
Sri Lanka women's national basketball team
Sri Lanka men's national 3x3 team

References

3x3
Women's national 3x3 basketball teams